The Women's artistic team all-around competition at the 2018 Mediterranean Games was held between the 23–24 June 2018 at the Pavelló Olímpic de Reus.

Qualified teams

The following NOCs qualified a team for the event.

Final

Source:

References

Women's artistic team all-around
2018
Mediterranean Games
2018 in women's gymnastics
Women's events at the 2018 Mediterranean Games